Bağırbəyli (also, Bagyrbeyli) is a village in the Ujar Rayon of Azerbaijan.  The village forms part of the municipality of Quləbənd.

References 

Populated places in Ujar District